Hyle is a philosophical concept.

Hyle may also refer to:
Hyle (Boeotia), a town of ancient Boeotia, Greece
Hyle (Cyprus), a town of ancient Cyprus
Hyle (Locris), a town of ancient Locris, Greece
Michael William Hyle (1901-1967), American Roman Catholic bishop